Tribal Research Institute Museum is in Ranchi, the capital of the Indian state of Jharkhand.  If You Want To Apply For Jharkhand Scholarship Pre or Post Matric The You Can Apply. You Can Check Many Information Like ,Documents, Eligibility,Dates, How to Apply, How to check status and many More..Click Here To Check Details.. This e kalyan scholarship form all students of Sc, St And OBC, Here General Candidates are not allowed.

Tribes displayed
 Asur
 Baiga
 Bedia
 Bhumij
 Binjhia
 Birhor
 Birjia
 Kanwar
 Karmali
 Kharia
 Kharwar
 Khond

 Kora
 Munda
 Oraon

 Lohra
 Asur
 Santal
 Sauriya Paharia
 Sawar

References

Research institutes in Jharkhand
Museums in Ranchi
Year of establishment missing